The 1994 Japan Open Tennis Championships was a combined men's and women's tennis tournament played on outdoor hard courts at the Ariake Coliseum in Tokyo in Japan that was part of the Championship Series of the 1994 ATP Tour and of Tier III of the 1994 WTA Tour. The tournament was held from 4 April through 11 April 1994. Pete Sampras and Kimiko Date won the singles titles.

Finals

Men's singles

 Pete Sampras defeated  Michael Chang 6–4, 6–2
 It was Sampras' 6th title of the year and the 28th of his career.

Women's singles

 Kimiko Date defeated  Amy Frazier 7–5, 6–0
 It was Date's 2nd title of the year and the 4th of her career.

Men's doubles

 Henrik Holm /  Anders Järryd defeated  Sébastien Lareau /  Patrick McEnroe 7–6, 6–1
 It was Holm's 2nd title of the year and the 5th of his career. It was Järryd's 2nd title of the year and the 65th of his career.

Women's doubles

 Mami Donoshiro /  Ai Sugiyama defeated  Yayuk Basuki /  Nana Miyagi 6–4, 6–1
 It was Donoshiro's only title of the year and the 1st of her career. It was Sugiyama's only title of the year and the 1st of her career.

References

External links
 Official website
 ATP tournament profile